Joel Brown (born January 31, 1980, in Baltimore, Maryland) is an American hurdler.

He finished sixth at the 2005 World Championships and seventh at the 2005 World Athletics Final.

Comprises 1/4 of the World Record Shuttle Hurdle Relay team (Aubrey Herring, David Oliver, Aries Merritt) that ran 53.31 at the 2008 Penn Relay Carnival

His personal best time is 13.20 seconds, achieved in June 9, 2011 at the Bislett Games.

Brown was managed for 9 years by his agent and former high school coach Mark Pryor of World Express Sports Management

External links
 
 

1980 births
Living people
American male hurdlers
Track and field athletes from Baltimore